Lionel Charles Jeffries (10 June 1926 – 19 February 2010) was an English actor, director, and screenwriter. He appeared primarily in films and received a Golden Globe Award nomination during his acting career.

Early life
Jeffries was born in Forest Hill, south London. Both his parents were social workers with the Salvation Army. As a boy, he attended the Queen Elizabeth Grammar School in Wimborne Minster in Dorset.

In 1945, he received a commission in the Oxford and Buckinghamshire Light Infantry and served in Burma at the Rangoon radio station during the Second World War, being awarded the Burma Star. (He blamed the humidity there for his hair loss at the age of 19.) He also served as a captain in the Royal West African Frontier Force.

Career
He trained at the Royal Academy of Dramatic Art. He entered repertory at the David Garrick Theatre, Lichfield, Staffordshire for two years and appeared in early British television plays.
Jeffries built a successful career in British films mainly in comic character roles and as he was prematurely bald he often played characters older than himself, such as the role of father to Caractacus Potts (played by Dick Van Dyke) in the film Chitty Chitty Bang Bang (1968), although Jeffries was actually six months younger than Van Dyke.

His acting career reached a peak in the 1960s with leading roles in other films like Two-Way Stretch (1960), The Trials of Oscar Wilde (1960), Murder Ahoy! (opposite Margaret Rutherford), First Men in the Moon (1964) and Camelot (1967).

Jeffries turned to writing and directing children's films, including a well-regarded version of The Railway Children (1970) and The Amazing Mr Blunden (1972). He was a member of the British Catholic Stage Guild.

Jeffries had a negative attitude towards television and avoided the medium for many years. He reluctantly appeared on television in an acting role in the 1980 London Weekend Television Dennis Potter drama Cream in My Coffee and realised that television production values were now little different from those in the film industry; as a result he developed a belated career in television. He appeared in an episode of the Thames Television/ITV comedy drama Minder in 1983 as Cecil Caine, an eccentric widower, and in an episode of Inspector Morse in 1990 (Central Television/Zenith/ITV).

He starred as Tom (Thomas Maddisson) in the Thames/ITV situation comedy Tom, Dick and Harriet with Ian Ogilvy and Brigit Forsyth.

Retirement and death
Jeffries retired from acting in 2001 and his health declined in the following years. He died on 19 February 2010, at a nursing home in Poole, Dorset. He had suffered from vascular dementia for the last twelve years of his life. He was 83.

He was married to Eileen Mary Walsh from 1951 until his death. They had a son and two daughters. His son Ty Jeffries is a composer, lyricist and cabaret artist.  Lionel Jeffries' granddaughter is the novelist and playwright Amy Mason.

His name is mentioned before the ending titles in the film The First Men in the Moon, released in 2010: "For Lionel Jeffries 1926–2010".

Complete filmography

As actor

 Stage Fright (1950) – Bald RADA Student (uncredited)
 Will Any Gentleman...? (1953) – Mr. Frobisher
 The Black Rider (1954) – Martin Bremner
 The Colditz Story (1955) – Harry Tyler
 The Quatermass Xperiment (1955) – Blake
 No Smoking (1955) – George Pogson
 All for Mary (1955) – Maitre D', Hotel
 Windfall (1955) – Arthur Lee
 Jumping for Joy (1956) – Bert Benton
 Bhowani Junction (1956) – Lt. Graham McDaniel
 The Baby and the Battleship (1956) – George
 Eyewitness (1956) – Man in Pub
 Lust for Life (1956) – Dr. Peyron
 High Terrace (1956) – Monkton
 Up in the World (1957) – Wilson
 The Man in the Sky (1957) – Keith
 Doctor at Large (1957) – Dr. Hatchet
 Hour of Decision (1957) – Elvin Main
 The Vicious Circle (1957) – Geoffrey Windsor
 Barnacle Bill (1957) – Garrod
 Blue Murder at St Trinian's (1957) – Joe Mangan
 Dunkirk (1958) – Colonel – Medical Officer
 Charles and Mary (1958, TV Movie) – George Dyer
 Up the Creek (1958) – Steady Barker
 The Revenge of Frankenstein (1958) – Fritz
 Law and Disorder (1958) – Major Proudfoot
 Orders to Kill (1958) – Interrogator
 Girls at Sea (1958) – Harry, the Tourist
 Behind the Mask (1958) – Walter Froy
 Further Up the Creek (1958) – Steady Barker
 Nowhere to Go (1958) – Pet Shop Clerk (uncredited)
 Idle on Parade (1959) – Bertie
 The Nun's Story (1959) – Dr. Goovaerts 
 Bobbikins (1959) – Gregory Mason
 Please Turn Over (1959) – Ian Howard
 Two-Way Stretch (1960) – Chief P.O. Crout
 Jazz Boat (1960) – Sergeant Thompson
 Life is a Circus (1960) – Genie
 Let's Get Married (1960) – Marsh
 The Trials of Oscar Wilde (1960) – John Sholto Douglas, Marquis of Queensberry
 Tarzan the Magnificent (1960) – Ames
 Fanny (1961) – Monsieur Brun (The Englishman)
 The Hellions (1961) – Luke Billings
 Operation Snatch (1962) – Evans
 Mrs. Gibbon's Boys (1962) – Lester Gibbons
 The Notorious Landlady (1962) – Inspector Oliphant
 Kill or Cure (1962) – Det. Insp. Hook
 The Wrong Arm of the Law (1963) – Inspector Fred 'Nosey' Parker
 Call me Bwana (1963) – Ezra
 The Scarlet Blade (1963) – Col. Judd
 The Long Ships (1964) – Aziz
 First Men in the Moon (1964) – Cavor / Joseph Cavor
 Murder Ahoy! (1964) – Captain Sydney De Courcy Rhumstone
 The Truth About Spring (1965) – 'Cark' / Cark
 You Must Be Joking! (1965) – Sgt. Maj. McGregor
 The Secret of My Success (1965) – Insp. Hobart / Baron von Lukenberg / The Earl of Aldershot / President Esteda
 The Spy with a Cold Nose (1966) – Stanley Farquhar
 Drop Dead Darling (1966) – Parker
 Oh Dad, Poor Dad, Mamma's Hung You in the Closet and I'm Feelin' So Sad (1967) – Airport Commander
 Camelot (1967) – King Pellinore
 Jules Verne's Rocket to the Moon (1967) – Sir Charles Dillworthy
 Chitty Chitty Bang Bang (1968) – Grandpa Potts
 12 + 1 (1969) – Randomhouse
 Twinky (1970) – Solicitor
 Eyewitness (1970) – Grandpa
 The Railway Children (1970) – Malcolm (uncredited)
 Whoever Slew Auntie Roo? (1972) – Inspector Ralph Willoughby
 Royal Flash (1975) – Kraftstein
 What Changed Charley Farthing? (1976) – Houlihan
 Wombling Free (1978) – Womble (voice)
 The Prisoner of Zenda (1979) – General Sapt
 Cream in My Coffee (1980, TV Movie) – Bernard Wilsher
 Better Late Than Never (1983) – Bertie Hargreaves
 Abel's Island (1988 short) – Gower (voice)
 Danny, the Champion of the World (1989, TV Movie) – Mr. Snoddy
 A Chorus of Disapproval (1989) – Jarvis Huntley-Pike
 First and Last (1989, TV Movie) – Laurence
 Ending Up (1989, TV Movie) – Shorty
 Jekyll & Hyde (1990, TV Movie) – Jekyll's Father
 Heaven on Earth (1998, TV Movie) – Isaac Muller

As writer or director
 The Railway Children (1970) – director and screenwriter
 The Amazing Mr. Blunden (1972) – director and screenwriter
 Baxter! (1973) – director
 Wombling Free (1977) – director and screenwriter
 The Water Babies (1978) – director and additional material writer
 Nelson's Touch (1979 short) – screenwriter

References

External links

 
 
 
 Lionel Jeffries – Daily Telegraph obituary
 Lionel Jeffries – Times obituary

1926 births
2010 deaths
20th-century English male actors
English film directors
Alumni of RADA
British Army personnel of World War II
Converts to Roman Catholicism
Deaths from dementia in England
Deaths from vascular dementia
English male film actors
English Roman Catholics
English screenwriters
English male screenwriters
English male stage actors
English male television actors
Oxfordshire and Buckinghamshire Light Infantry officers
Actors from Dorset
Military personnel from London
People from Forest Hill, London
People educated at Queen Elizabeth's Grammar School, Wimborne Minster
Royal West African Frontier Force officers
Audiobook narrators